Kenneth John Robert Hewkins (30 October 1929 – 9 June 2013) was a South African footballer, who .was 19 years old when he played goal keeper in the final for Delfos when they won the 1949 Transvaal Challenge Cup.Ken Hewhins also represented his province Southern Transvaal.He also played overseas as a goalkeeper for Clyde and Fulham. Hewkins made 15 league appearances for Clyde in 1949-50 before returning to South Africa. In October 1954, Clyde signed Hewkins for the second time and he was part of the Clyde team that won the 1954–55 Scottish Cup. After 19 Scottish league appearances in his second spell, he signed for Fulham in November 1955.

References

3 Barry Ian sANDERS

External links

1929 births
2013 deaths
Soccer players from Pretoria
Association football goalkeepers
South African soccer players
Scottish Football League players
English Football League players
Germiston Callies F.C. players
Clyde F.C. players
Fulham F.C. players
Cape Town City F.C. (NFL) players
Berea Park F.C. players
South African expatriate soccer players
Expatriate footballers in Scotland
Expatriate footballers in England
South African expatriate sportspeople in Scotland
South African expatriate sportspeople in England
National Football League (South Africa) players